St. Stephen's Abbey, Augsburg (formerly Stift St. Stephan) is a Benedictine monastery, formerly a house of Augustinian canonesses, in Augsburg in Bavaria, Germany.

First foundation

The monastery, dedicated to Saint Stephen, was founded in 968 by Saint Ulrich, Bishop of Augsburg, and used by Augustinian canonesses. It was dissolved in the secularisation of Bavaria in 1803, and the premises passed into the possession of the town. The army used the site for a few years as a quartermaster's store.

Second foundation
In 1828 King Ludwig I of Bavaria founded a grammar school here, as a successor to the former Jesuit college of St. Salvator (1582–1807). In 1835 he established the Benedictine monastery and entrusted it with the running of the school. Barnabas Huber, who had been staying with Prince Fugger of Babenhusen since the closing of Ottobeuren Abbey was selected as the first abbot. In company with Ignatius Albert von Riegg, Bishop of Augsburg (1824–36), he traveled to Benedictine monasteries in Austria and Switzerland, and returned with about twenty monks to make up the new community. As the house began to grow, many of them returned to their respective abbeys. Huber's installation as abbot took place in November 1835. The monks took up teaching at the Royal Lyceum, the Catholic Gymnasium, and the seminary.

The buildings were entirely destroyed in 1944 but have been re-built.

The monks continue to run the school and boarding house, and are engaged in pastoral and youth work.

The abbey belongs to the Bavarian Congregation of the Benedictine Confederation.

References

External links
 St. Stephen's Abbey website
 Klöster in Bayern

969 establishments
1803 disestablishments in the Holy Roman Empire
1835 establishments in Bavaria
Religious organizations disestablished in 1803
Religious organizations established in 1835
Benedictine monasteries in Germany
Monasteries of Canonesses Regular
Monasteries in Bavaria
Christian monasteries established in the 10th century
Christian monasteries disestablished in the 19th century
19th-century Christian monasteries
10th-century establishments in Germany
10th-century churches in Germany
19th-century Roman Catholic church buildings in Germany